Derbyshire County Cricket Club in 1973 was the cricket season when the English club Derbyshire had been playing for one hundred and two years. In the County Championship, they won two matches to  finish sixteenth in their seventy-ninth season in the Championship. They won five matches in the John Player League to finish twelfth. They were eliminated in the first round of the Gillette Cup and did not progress beyond group level in the Benson & Hedges Cup.

1973 season

Derbyshire played 20 games in the County Championship, one match against Oxford University, and one match each  against the touring New Zealanders and West Indians. They won three first class matches overall, two  in the County Championship. Brian Bolus was in his first season  as captain.  Brian Bolus scored most runs overall, although   Michael Page  scored most in the County Championship. Srinivasaraghavan Venkataraghavan took most wickets.

Matches

First Class
{| class="wikitable" width="100%"
! bgcolor="#efefef" colspan=6 | List of  matches
|- bgcolor="#efefef"
!No.
!Date
!V
!Result 
!Margin
!Notes
|-
|1
| 12 May 1973
| Warwickshire  Queen's Park, Chesterfield 
 |bgcolor="#FF0000"|Lost 
| 16 runs
|    M Hendrick 8-45; McVicar 5-58 
|- 
|2
| 16 May 1973
 | Essex  County Ground, Chelmsford 
 |bgcolor="#FF0000"|Lost 
| Innings and 28 runs
|    East 6-35 and 6-95 
|- 
|3
| 23 May 1973
 | New Zealanders County Ground, Derby 
 |bgcolor="#FFCC00"|Drawn
| 
|     
|- 
|4
| 26 May 1973
| Northamptonshire   County Ground, Northampton 
 |bgcolor="#FFCC00"|Drawn
| 
|    Cottam 6-45 
|- 
|5
| 6 Jun 1973
|  WorcestershireCounty Ground, Derby 
 |bgcolor="#FF0000"|Lost 
| 5 wickets
|    Holder 5-29; M Hendrick 5-64 
|- 
|6
|  9 Jun 1973
| Lancashire   Old Trafford, Manchester 
 |bgcolor="#FFCC00"|Drawn
| 
|    Lee 6-53 
|- 
|7
|16 Jun 1973
| Yorkshire  Queen's Park, Chesterfield 
 |bgcolor="#FFCC00"|Drawn
| 
|    Sharpe 110 
|- 
|8
| 20 Jun 1973
| |Oxford University     The University Parks, Oxford 
|bgcolor="#00FF00"|Won 
| 4 wickets
|     
|- 
|9
|  23 Jun 1973
| Middlesex   Ind Coope Ground, Burton-on-Trent  
 |bgcolor="#FFCC00"|Drawn
| 
|    Titmus 6-40 
|- 
|10
| 30 Jun 1973
| Leicestershire  Grace Road, Leicester 
 |bgcolor="#FF0000"|Lost 
| 2 wickets
|    S Venkataraghavan 7-100 
|- 
|11
|4 Jul 1973
| Glamorgan   Sophia Gardens, Cardiff 
|bgcolor="#00FF00"|Won 
| 56 runs
|    Nash 6-99; RS Swindell 5-52; S Venkataraghavan 6-67 
|- 
|12
 | 7 Jul 1973
| Kent County Ground, Derby 
|bgcolor="#FFCC00"|Drawn
| 
|    Luckhurst 215; Johnson 130 
|- 
|13
|   14 Jul 1973
| Lancashire   Park Road Ground, Buxton 
|bgcolor="#FFCC00"|Drawn
| 
|     
|- 
|14
| 25 Jul 1973
|  Surrey<small> Queen's Park, Chesterfield
 |bgcolor="#FF0000"|Lost 
| 57 runs
|    Ahmed 117; Pocock 5-67 
|- 
|15
| 28 Jul 1973
| Yorkshire   Bramall Lane, Sheffield
 |bgcolor="#FF0000"|Lost 
| 4 wickets
|    JB Bolus 138; M Hendrick 5-69 
|- 
|16
|4 Aug 1973
| Nottinghamshire    Rutland Recreation Ground, Ilkeston 
 |bgcolor="#FFCC00"|Drawn
| 
|    Sobers 100; 
|- 
|17
| 8 Aug 1973
| Hampshire   United Services Recreation Ground, Portsmouth 
 |bgcolor="#FF0000"|Lost 
| 10 wickets
|    Gilliat 103; RS Swindell 6-97; Sainsbury 5-41 
|- 
|18
| 11 Aug 1973
| SomersetClarence Park, Weston-super-Mare 
 |bgcolor="#FF0000"|Lost 
| 48 runs
|    FW Swarbrook 6-57; Cartwright 7-37 and 6-52 
|- 
|19
| 18 Aug 1973
|  Sussex     The Saffrons, Eastbourne
|bgcolor="#00FF00"|Won 
| 95 runs
|    FW Swarbrook 6-53; S Venkataraghavan 6-78 
|- 
|20
|  22 Aug 1973
|  Gloucestershire   County Ground, Derby
 |bgcolor="#FF0000"|Lost 
| 150 runs
|     
|- 
|21
|  25 Aug 1973
| Leicestershire  County Ground, Derby
 |bgcolor="#FF0000"|Lost 
| 2 wickets
|     
|- 
|22
|29 Aug 1973
 | West Indians     Queen's Park, Chesterfield 
 |bgcolor="#FF0000"|Lost 
| 163 runs
|    Lloyd 174; Ali 6-55 
|- 
|23
|8 Sep 1973
| Nottinghamshire    Trent Bridge, Nottingham 
 |bgcolor="#FFCC00"|Drawn
| 
|    Sobers 128; Harris 125; Edwards 5-44 
|-

John Player League
{| class="wikitable" width="70%"
! bgcolor="#efefef" colspan=6 | List of  matches
|- bgcolor="#efefef"
!No.
!Date
!V
!Result 
!Margin
!Notes
 |- 
|1
| 6 May 1973
| Hampshire  County Ground, Derby
|Abandoned 
| 
|     
|- 
|2
| 13 May 1973
| Warwickshire Edgbaston, Birmingham 
|Abandoned 
| 
|     
|- 
|3
|20 May 1973
| Essex    County Ground, Chelmsford 
 |bgcolor="#FF0000"|Lost 
| 14 runs
|     
|- 
|4
|27 May 1973
|  WorcestershireTipton Road, Dudley 
 |bgcolor="#FF0000"|Lost 
| 39 runs
|     
|- 
|5
| 3 Jun 1973
| Leicestershire  Ind Coope Ground, Burton-on-Trent 
 |bgcolor="#FF0000"|Lost 
| 8 wickets
|     
|- 
|6
| 24 Jun 1973
| Middlesex   Queen's Park, Chesterfield 
|bgcolor="#00FF00"|Won 
| 1 run
|     
|- 
|7
|1 Jul 1973
| Glamorgan   Park Road Ground, Buxton 
|bgcolor="#00FF00"|Won 
| 1 run
|    Nash 5-14 
|- 
|8
|8 Jul 1973
| Kent Queen's Park, Chesterfield 
 |bgcolor="#FF0000"|Lost 
| 5 wickets
|     
|- 
|9
|15 Jul 1973
| Northamptonshire   County Ground, Northampton 
 |bgcolor="#FFCC00"|No result
| 
|     
|- 
|10
|22 Jul 1973
| Yorkshire North Marine Road Ground, Scarborough 
 |bgcolor="#FF0000"|Lost 
| 87 runs
|     
|- 
|11
|29 Jul 1973
|  Surrey County Ground, Derby 
|bgcolor="#00FF00"|Won 
| 68 runs
|     
|- 
|12
|5 Aug 1973
| Lancashire   Old Trafford, Manchester  
|bgcolor="#FF0000"|Lost 
| Faster rate
|     
|- 
|13
| 12 Aug 1973
| SomersetClarence Park, Weston-super-Mare 
|bgcolor="#FF0000"|Lost 
| 8 wickets
|     
|- 
|14
|19 Aug 1973
|  Sussex     The Saffrons, Eastbourne 
|bgcolor="#FF0000"|Lost 
| 4 wickets
|    Buss 5-36 
|- 
|15
| 2 Sep 1973
|  Gloucestershire   Queen's Park, Chesterfield 
|bgcolor="#00FF00"|Won 
| 11 runs
|     
|- 
|16
|9 Sep 1973
| Nottinghamshire    County Ground, Derby
|bgcolor="#00FF00"|Won 
| 16 runs
|     
|- 
|

Gillette Cup 
{| class="wikitable" width="60%"
! bgcolor="#efefef" colspan=6 | List of  matches
|- bgcolor="#efefef"
!No.
!Date
!V
!Result 
!Margin
!Notes
 |- 
|1st Round
|   11 Jul 1973
|  Sussex    Queen's Park, Chesterfield
|bgcolor="#FF0000"|Lost 
| 111 runs
|     
|-

Benson and Hedges Cup
{| class="wikitable" width="60%"
! bgcolor="#efefef" colspan=6 | List of  matches
|- bgcolor="#efefef"
!No.
!Date
!V
!Result 
!Margin
!Notes
|-
| Group A 1
|28 Apr 1973
| Nottinghamshire    Queen's Park, Chesterfield 
|bgcolor="#FF0000"|Lost 
| 33 runs
|     
|- 
 | Group A 2
|7 May 1973
| Yorkshire Park Avenue Cricket Ground, Bradford 
|bgcolor="#FF0000"|Lost 
| 5 wickets
|     
|- 
| Group A 3
| 19 May 1973
| Lancashire   Rutland Recreation Ground, Ilkeston 
|bgcolor="#FF0000"|Lost 
| 4 wickets
|     
|- 
 | Group A 4
|2 Jun 1973
| Minor Counties North Tean Road Sports Ground, Cheadle  
|bgcolor="#00FF00"|Won 
| 5 wickets
|     
|-

Statistics

Competition batting averages

Competition bowling averages

Wicket Keeping
Bob Taylor
County Championship Catches 33, Stumping 9
John Player League  Catches 7, Stumping 5
Gillette Cup  Catches 3, Stumping 0 
Benson and Hedges Cup Catches 1, Stumping 0

See also
Derbyshire County Cricket Club seasons
1973 English cricket season

References

1973 in English cricket
Derbyshire County Cricket Club seasons